Ayawasi is a village of about 1,200 people in the Indonesia province of Southwest Papua. It is located in the Ayfat area, north of the Ayamaru Lakes, and it is the site of Ayawasi Airport.

The village was established by the Dutch around 1953. Prior to this, the people of this area lived scattered in small groups in their respective ancestral grounds, where each group had its own "family dialect" differing in small ways from the dialect of the other groups. As of the 1990s, around 95% of the population are indigenous Maybrat, the rest have come from other parts of Indonesia to work in the schools, government offices and the Catholic mission. The Maybrat people of Ayawasi are fully bilingual in Maybrat and Indonesian. The Maybrat language spoken in Ayawasi has been the subject of a 2007 descriptive grammar, and a major ethnographic study on the people was conducted in the 1970s.

References

Bibliography 

Populated places in West Papua